Daniel Alberto Fernández (born 23 February 1978) is an Argentine former footballer who played for clubs in Argentina, Albania and Chile.

References
 

1978 births
Living people
Argentine footballers
Argentine expatriate footballers
Chacarita Juniors footballers
Club Atlético Los Andes footballers
FK Dinamo Tirana players
Santiago Wanderers footballers
Puerto Montt footballers
Coquimbo Unido footballers
Cobreloa footballers
Expatriate footballers in Chile
Expatriate footballers in Albania
Association football forwards
Sportspeople from Mendoza Province